Digital Wings 1 is a various artists compilation album released in 1997 released by The Cyberden.

Reception
In their review of the album, Chaos Control said "the production is always good, making Digital Wings 1 an ideal sampler of current underground electronic acts." Electro Zine said "while some of the tracks arent fabulous they are all still a great effort, the standouts of Course being the opening track by Xorcist, Gridlock's track from their debut cd and the nice piece of darkwave ambient by Seofon." Last Sigh said "this CD heralds an array of verytasty bands and sounds not to be missed by those of you who enjoy the dark electro death-ambient definitive power glide of said genres" and called it "an excellent compilation for the power electro enthusiast."

Track listing

Personnel
Adapted from the Digital Wings 1 liner notes.

Release history

References

External links 
 Digital Wings 1 at Discogs (list of releases)

1997 compilation albums